Alan Richard Hill later Hill-Walker, VC (born Northallerton 12 July 1859 – 21 April 1944) was an English recipient of the Victoria Cross, the highest and most prestigious award for gallantry in the face of the enemy that can be awarded to British and Commonwealth forces. He won the VC for his actions on 28 January 1881 at the Battle of Laing's Nek during the First Boer War.

After his marriage in 1902, he adopted the surname Hill-Walker.

Early life
Alan Richard Hill was the son of Captain Thomas Hill, chief constable of the North Riding of Yorkshire Constabulary and Frances Mirriam, daughter of Thomas Walker. He was educated at Richmond Grammar School.

Hill was commissioned in July 1876 as a sub-lieutenant in the North Yorkshire Militia. He transferred to the 58th (Rutlandshire) Regiment of Foot in February 1879. The regiment was deployed to South Africa in 1879 for service in the Anglo-Zulu War and he saw action at the Battle of Ulundi in July 1879.

Details

Hill was 21 years old, and a lieutenant in the 58th (Rutlandshire) Regiment of Foot (which had become the 2nd Battalion, The Northamptonshire Regiment under the Childers Reforms by the time the award was gazetted), British Army during the First Boer War when the following deed took place on 28 January 1881 at the Battle of Laing's Nek, South Africa, for which he was awarded the VC.

The citation reads; "For gallant conduct at the action of Laing's Nek on the 28th January, 1881, in having, after the retreat was ordered, remained behind and endeavoured to carry out of action Lieutenant Baillie, of the same Corps, who was lying on the ground severely wounded. Being unable to lift that officer into the saddle, he carried him in his arms until Lieutenant Baillie was shot dead. Lieutenant Hill then brought a wounded man out of action on his horse, after which he returned and rescued another. All these acts being performed under a heavy fire."

Laing's Nek was the last occasion that a British regiment carried its colours into action. The 58th were led up the hillside by Lieutenant Lancelot Baillie carrying the Regimental Colour and Hill carrying the Queen's Colour. Baillie was mortally wounded. Hill passed the two colours to Sergeant Budstock for safe keeping.

Further information
He was adjutant of the 3rd and 4th battalions from October 1887 and achieved the rank of major before he retired from the army in October 1901. 

In April 1902 he married, in London, Muriel Lilias Oliphant Walker (1876–1953), daughter of T. S. Walker, of Maunby Hall, Thirsk, Yorkshire. He changed his name to Hill-Walker. There were two sons:
Lieutenant-Colonel Gerald Alan Hill-Walker (1903–1980).
Lieutenant-Commander Thomas Harry Hill-Walker (1904–1940), was killed in action in 1940.

Hill's medals were bought in 2015 by the Ashcroft Trust and are displayed in the Imperial War Museum.

See also
John Doogan also won the VC at Laing's Nek.

References

Monuments to Courage (David Harvey, 1999)
The Register of the Victoria Cross (This England, 1997)
Victoria Crosses of the Anglo-Boer War (Ian Uys, 2000)

External links

Location of grave and VC medal (North Yorkshire)

1859 births
1944 deaths
British recipients of the Victoria Cross
First Boer War recipients of the Victoria Cross
Northamptonshire Regiment officers
People from Northallerton
British military personnel of the First Boer War
British Army personnel of the Anglo-Zulu War
58th Regiment of Foot officers
British Militia officers
British military personnel of the Tirah campaign
British Army recipients of the Victoria Cross
Military personnel from Yorkshire